The 1971 Stanford Indians football team represented Stanford University during the 1971 NCAA University Division football season. Led by ninth-year head coach John Ralston, the Indians were 8–3 in the regular season and repeated as Pacific-8 Conference champions at 6–1.

Season
The previous season, the Indians won the Pac-8 title and upset undefeated Ohio State in the Rose Bowl behind Heisman Trophy-winning quarterback Jim Plunkett, the first overall pick in the 1971 NFL Draft.

With the core of the "Thunder Chickens" defense returning, led by Jeff Siemon and Pete Lazetich, and an offense under the steady leadership of fifth-year senior quarterback Don Bunce, the Indians defended the conference title and upset fourth-ranked Michigan in the Rose Bowl.

Shortly after their New Year's Day victory, Ralston resigned to become head coach and general manager of the Denver Broncos in the National Football League. A few weeks later, offensive coordinator Mike White was hired as head coach at rival California, his alma mater, and Stanford promoted defensive assistant Jack Christiansen to head coach.

This was the final season with the "Indians" nickname, which was changed to "Cardinals" for 1972, and reduced to the singular "Cardinal" in 1982.

Schedule

Roster

NFL Draft
Six Stanford players were selected in the 1972 NFL Draft

References

Stanford
Stanford Cardinal football seasons
Pac-12 Conference football champion seasons
Rose Bowl champion seasons
Stanford Indians football